A Hole in the Head (1959) is a DeLuxe Color comedy film, shown in CinemaScope, directed by Frank Capra, featuring Frank Sinatra, Edward G. Robinson, Eleanor Parker, Keenan Wynn, Carolyn Jones, Thelma Ritter, Dub Taylor, Ruby Dandridge, Eddie Hodges, and Joi Lansing, and released by United Artists. It was based upon the play of the same name by Arnold Schulman.

The film introduced the song "High Hopes" by Sammy Cahn and Jimmy Van Heusen, a Sinatra standard used as a campaign song by John F. Kennedy during the presidential election the following year. Sinatra portrays a lowlife dreamer named Tony whose old friend Jerry Marks, now a rich man, expresses interest in his plan to build a Disneyland in Florida (the film predates Walt Disney World by 12 years)—until Jerry notices that Tony seems too desperate when the latter cheers for a dog upon which he's bet heavily. The movie ends with Tony, his lady friend Eloise, and his son Ally singing "High Hopes" on the beach. Sinatra sings "All My Tomorrows," another Cahn/Van Heusen song, under the opening titles.

Sammy Cahn and Jimmy Van Heusen won the Academy Award for Best Original Song for "High Hopes".

Plot
Tony Manetta moved from the shabby area of the Bronx, New York to Miami, Florida with two friends, searching for wealth and success. One friend became prosperous over the next 20 years (owning luxury hotels) and is a promoter, while his younger friend drives a local taxi. Tony manages a small hotel called Garden of Eden. He grew up poor but spoiled, spending money on expensive suits and a Cadillac despite always being in debt and refusing to become more responsible. He is also a widowed father of an 11-year-old son named Alvin (nicknamed Ally).

In debt, the rent five months in arrears, Tony is given 48 hours by his landlord, Abe Diamond, to raise $5,300 or else lose the hotel. In desperation, Tony calls his older brother Mario, who owns and operates a clothing store and has already loaned Tony money multiple times. Tony lies and says he needs a loan because Ally is ill. Mario and wife Sophie promptly fly from New York City to Miami and discover the truth.

In Mario's eyes, Tony is a bum who wastes money on fanciful dreams rather than honest, hard work. He agrees to stake Tony the funds but only for a sensible small business, not dreams of fancy hotels or casinos. Mario also sets him up with Eloise Rogers, a widow and an acquaintance of Sophie, who is considered a more appropriate companion for Tony than his current girlfriend, Shirl.

To his surprise, Tony is impressed with Eloise. Ally also takes an immediate liking to her. Mario offends her, however, with prying questions about her late husband's will and finances, causing Tony to confess why they were introduced. Eloise reveals to Tony that, having lost both her husband and son, she appreciates the notion of being with someone who needs her.

The old childhood pal, Jerry Marks, now a wealthy promoter, invites Tony to a party. Pretending to be prosperous, Tony explains his scheme to buy land in Florida and open a second Disneyland there. Jerry seems interested in being his partner again.

He takes Tony to a greyhound racing track, where Tony uses the $500 he earned from selling his Cadillac to match Jerry's large bet. His dog wins, but he lets it ride in the next race on a dog called Lucky Ally. The obvious desperation in Tony's voice as he roots for the dog to win indicates to Jerry that he is not a man of means. Jerry chastises him afterwards and tries to brush him off by insultingly handing him some cash. When Tony throws the cash handout back in Jerry's face, Tony is punched by one of Jerry's bodyguards.

Literally a beaten man, Tony decides it would be best if Ally lived in New York with Mario and Sophie, telling the unconvinced boy that he is unwanted. Tony goes off to the beach by himself, but Ally finds him, and soon Eloise happily joins them. Mario and Sophie decide to take a long overdue vacation.

Cast

Broadway play
The film was based on the Broadway play of the same name by Arnold Schulman. It debuted at the Plymouth Theatre on Broadway on February 28, 1957, and featured actor Paul Douglas in the lead role. The play earned a Tony Award for Boris Aronson in 1958 for Best Scenic Design. On July 13, 1957, the show closed after a total of 156 performances. Sinatra's agent, Bert Allenberg, bought the film rights for $200,000 plus 5% of the profits.

The play/film was re-adapted a decade later as the Broadway musical Golden Rainbow, a theatrical vehicle for Steve Lawrence and Eydie Gorme.

The play had originated as a one-act play titled "The Dragon's Head", written by Schulman during Robert Anderson's playwriting course of the American Theatre Wing in 1949. It was expanded and staged by the Theatre Guild in Westport, Connecticut under the name My Fiddle Has Three Strings. Schulman wrote a new version titled The Hearts of Forgotten Hotel and shortened it to a one-hour version, which was broadcast as part of the Playwrights '56 anthology television series in 1955. The show drew the attention of Garson Kanin, who asked Schulman to convert it for Broadway.

Production
The screenplay was adapted by Schulman, whose father was the operator of a hotel in Miami, Florida, like the protagonist of A Hole in the Head. The actual hotel used for the exterior shots was the Cardozo Hotel, located on Miami Beach's Ocean Drive. Shot over 40 days from 10 November 1958 to 9 January 1959, the film did was not a smooth production, particularly during the location filming at Miami Beach. Sinatra's relations with the press were problematic, with the media concentrating on anti-Sinatra rumors.

Aided by William Daniels, Capra completed the film 80 days ahead of schedule, partly the result of his shooting very long takes, knowing of Sinatra's famed antipathy for doing a scene more than once. Its final production cost of $1.89 million was under the allotted budget.

Release
The film opened on June 17, 1959. Although having some positive reviews, the film was a modest box-office success, earning theatrical rentals of $5.2 million in the United States and Canada.

Schulman wrote a novel based on the film containing additional material.

Accolades
The film is recognized by American Film Institute in these lists:
 2004: AFI's 100 Years...100 Songs:	
 "High Hopes" – Nominated

See also
 List of American films of 1959

References

External links
 
 
 
 
 Tribute Site

1959 films
1959 comedy films
American comedy films
American films based on plays
Films directed by Frank Capra
Films scored by Nelson Riddle
Films set in hotels
Films set in Miami
Films that won the Best Original Song Academy Award
Films about gambling
United Artists films
CinemaScope films
1950s English-language films
1950s American films